The Nuclear Safeguards and Electricity (Finance) Act 1978 (1978 c. 25) is an Act of the Parliament of the United Kingdom which gave effect to Safeguards associated with the international agreement on nuclear weapons. It also authorised the financing of Drax power station.

Background 
The Treaty on the Non-proliferation of Nuclear Weapons was made on 6 September 1976. In an agreement between the European Atomic Energy Community and the International Atomic Energy Agency the UK had a Safeguards Agreement in connection with the Treaty. This Act gave effect to that agreement.

Parliament agreed that the Central Electricity Generating Board could use up to £50 million to build the second stage of the Drax power station in Yorkshire.

Nuclear Safeguards and Electricity (Finance) Act 1978 
The Nuclear Safeguards and Electricity (Finance) Act 1978 received Royal Assent on 30 June 1978. Its long title is ‘An Act to make provision for giving effect to an International Agreement for the application of Safeguards in the United Kingdom in connection with the Treaty on the Non-Proliferation of Nuclear Weapons; and to authorise contributions by the Secretary of State to expenditure by the Central Electricity Generating Board in connection with the construction of the second stage of the Board’s generating station at Drax.’

Provisions 
The Act comprised six Sections:

 Section 1 The Safeguards Agreement. Agreement initially presented to Parliament on 3 March 1977.
 Section 2 Rights of Agency inspectors. Making an inspection, prohibited places controlled by the Atomic Energy Authority, making false statements, fines.
 Section 3 Regulations for giving effect to certain provisions of Safeguards Agreement. The Secretary of State empowered to make regulations associated with the Safeguards Agreement.
 Section 4 Offences by bodies Corporate, Offences by individuals and bodies corporate.           
 Section 5 Contributions by Secretary of State towards expenditure in connection with stage two of Drax power station
 Section 6 Short title and extent. The Act extends to Northern Ireland

Effects of the Act 
The construction of stage two of Drax power station was completed in May 1986. The Safeguards Agreement has been periodically revised; the current (2022) version was made in Vienna on 7 June 2018. The Nuclear Safeguards were extended to Guernsey, Jersey and Isle of Man in 2004. There is an altered relationship between the UK and the European Union as a result of Brexit.

Amendment 
The Act has been amended to include updated versions of the Safeguards Agreement, and the inclusion of the Crown Dependencies under the terms of the Act. Section 5 of the Safeguards Act was repealed by the Electricity Act 1989.

See also 

 Timeline of the UK electricity supply industry

References 

United Kingdom Acts of Parliament 1978
Electric power in the United Kingdom